Hafeez-ul-Rehman  – , known by his pen name Nushoor Wahidi (sometimes spelled Nushoor Wahedi or Nushoor Vahidi), was an Indian Urdu poet.

Early life
Born in 1912 in the village of Sheikhpur, Ballia District, United Province (renamed as Uttar Pradesh after the Indian independence), Wahidi had seven siblings. He received his early education at home.

Wahidi had begun to compose poems from an early age and by the age of 13  had become known in his locality as a poet.

Career
Wahidi was in a poetry session featuring the famous poet Jigar Moradabadi.  Jigar Moradabadi had been reciting poems for some time and desired to take a break. Wahidi offered to come on stage and recite a few of his own poems while Jigar Moradabadi did so.  It was in this forum that Nushoor was first recognized by the literary circles as a poet.

Nushoor published several compilations of Urdu poetry and a volume on philosophy, named the Sabah-e-hind.

Personal life

Wahidi died in 1983. The Indian prime minister, Indira Gandhi, personally called his family to condole his death.

A park in the city of Kanpur, India has been named in his honor.

References

External links 
 "Nushoor Wahedi Remembered", The Milli Gazette, 15 February 2002

Urdu-language poets from India
People from Ballia district
People from Kanpur
1910s births
20th-century Indian Muslims
Poets from Uttar Pradesh
1983 deaths
20th-century Indian poets
Indian male poets
20th-century Indian male writers